James Russell Dray (born December 31, 1986) is an American football coach and former tight end who is currently the tight ends coach for the Chicago Bears of the National Football League (NFL). He played college football at Stanford and was drafted by the Arizona Cardinals in the seventh round of the 2010 NFL Draft. He also played for the Cleveland Browns, Buffalo Bills, and San Francisco 49ers.

Early years
Born in New Milford, New Jersey, Dray grew up in nearby Paramus and played high school football at Bergen Catholic High School.

Playing career

Arizona Cardinals
On July 8, 2010, the Cardinals signed Dray to a four-year contract. The team did not announce the terms of the deal, but Adam Caplan of Foxsports.com reported that the contract was worth $1.84 million with a $49,000 signing bonus.

Cleveland Browns
On March 13, 2014, he signed with the Cleveland Browns. Dray's first season with the Browns ended with 17 receptions, for 242 yards, and 1 touchdown on 28 targets. In Dray's 2015 season, he had 6 receptions for 61 yards. On February 18, 2016, Dray was released.

Buffalo Bills
Dray signed with the Buffalo Bills on March 16, 2016. He was released on October 4, 2016.

San Francisco 49ers
Dray signed with the San Francisco 49ers on December 19, 2016.

Arizona Cardinals (second stint)
On September 15, 2017, Dray signed with the Cardinals, but was released four days later.

Coaching career

Stanford
Following his playing career, Dray started his coaching career at his alma mater Stanford as an offensive assistant.

Cleveland Browns
In 2019, Dray was hired by the Cleveland Browns as an offensive quality control coach.

Arizona Cardinals
After a year with the Browns, Dray went to the Cardinals at the same position.

Chicago Bears
Dray was hired as the tight ends coach under new Bears head coach Matt Eberflus and new offensive coordinator Luke Getsy on February 6, 2022.

References

External links
Cleveland Browns bio
Arizona Cardinals bio
Stanford Cardinal bio

1986 births
Living people
American football tight ends
Arizona Cardinals players
Bergen Catholic High School alumni
Buffalo Bills players
Cleveland Browns players
San Francisco 49ers players
People from New Milford, New Jersey
People from Paramus, New Jersey
Players of American football from New Jersey
Sportspeople from Bergen County, New Jersey
Stanford Cardinal football players
Chicago Bears coaches